George Gane was an English professional footballer who played as a full back.

Career
Gane played for Workington, Bradford City and Airdrieonians.

For Bradford City he made 35 appearances in the Football League; he also made 4 appearances in the FA Cup.

Sources

References

Year of birth missing
Year of death missing
English footballers
Workington A.F.C. players
Bradford City A.F.C. players
Airdrieonians F.C. (1878) players
English Football League players
Association football fullbacks